The New York State College of Veterinary Medicine at Cornell University is a college of veterinary medicine at Cornell University, Ithaca, New York. Founded in 1894, it is the first statutory college established by the State University of New York (SUNY) system.

History
The College of Veterinary Medicine was established by the New York State Legislature in 1894, and ratified by former Governor Roswell P. Flower, an individual who had become convinced of the value of veterinary medicine education by virtue of his personal farming experience. The College of Veterinary Medicine is an internationally recognized institution of public health, biomedical research, and veterinary medicine education.

The New York State legislature allocated funding to build a veterinary medicine education building on the Cornell University campus, James Law Hall, completed in fall of 1896. In 1957, New York state construction of a new veterinary medicine education complex on the eastern edge of the Cornell campus.

In 2015, the college completed a construction project that expanded class size capabilities and created an atrium and plaza. Three years later, it opened its Small Animal Community Practice, where student veterinarians perform vaccinations and routine surgeries with guidance from faculty. In 2019, it expanded its curriculum by creating the Center for Veterinary Business and Entrepreneurship, followed in 2020 by the Cornell Wildlife Health Center. Due to the established infrastructure of its Animal Health Diagnostic Center, the college operated the Cornell COVID-19 Testing Laboratory for the university, which in April 2021 passed 1 million tests.

The College of Veterinary Medicine is one of 30 veterinary colleges in the country, and one of only three in the Northeastern United States.

Academic programs

The Cornell University College of Veterinary Medicine is one of three institutions of higher education in veterinary medicine in the Northeastern United States, and one of a group of 30 Colleges and Schools of veterinary medicine education throughout the country. The core mission of the College to advance the health and well-being of animals and people through education, research, and public service.

Noted for D.V.M., M.S. and Ph.D. degree programs, and research programs including New York State Diagnostic Laboratory, Baker Institute for Animal Health, a center for canine and equine research, the Feline Health Center, and biomedical research laboratories, The Cornell University College of Veterinary Medicine ranks amongst the best in its field, selected as one of the best colleges for veterinary medicine by U.S. News & World Report's America's Best Colleges edition.

The DVM degree program provides student instruction in the biological basis of medicine, training in primary and referral veterinary care in the veterinary teaching hospital and ambulatory services, and instructed practice in the Community Practice Service primary care clinic. Direct access to numerous innovative dairy farms in the upstate New York region facilitate training in food animal medicine.  Cornell is consistently ranked the best veterinary college in the nation.

State University of New York School of Medicine and Biomedical Sciences students have been selected for prestigious Medical Research Fellowships.  The College recently expanded its class size from just 90 students a few years ago, to 120.

In recent years, some controversy at the College has surrounded clinician care.

Departments and units
The college comprises six academic departments, six centers, and four institutes.

Departments
Department of Biomedical Sciences
Department of Clinical Sciences
Department of Microbiology and Immunology
Department of Molecular Medicine
Department of Population Medicine and Diagnostic Sciences
Department of Public and Ecosystem Health

Centers
Center for Veterinary Business and Entrepreneurship
Cornell Riney Canine Health Center
Cornell Dairy Center of Excellence
Cornell Feline Health Center
Cornell Wildlife Health Center
Cornell Veterinary Biobank

Institutes
The Baker Institute for Animal Health
Duffield Institute for Animal Behavior
The Sprecher Institute for Comparative Cancer Research
Summer Dairy Institute

Cornell University Hospital for Animals
College founders taught and practiced veterinary medicine on Cornell’s campus as early as 1896 and multiple clinical spaces were built over the years. Currently, the Cornell University Hospital for Animals is a collection of seven hospitals in New York and Connecticut.

Companion Animal Hospital
Cornell Equine Hospital
Cornell Ruffian Equine Specialists
Cornell University Veterinary Specialists
Janet L. Swanson Wildlife Hospital
Nemo Farm Animal Hospital
Small Animal Community Practice

The current Ithaca space was built in 1996, and houses three of Cornell’s animal hospitals: The Companion Animal Hospital, the Cornell Equine Hospital, and the Nemo Farm Animal Hospital. It’s also the home of the hospital’s Ambulatory Service, which makes on-site visits to dairies and farms throughout the region. The college opened Cornell’s Small Animal Community Practice next door in 2018, which enables students to learn business and management skills, and is where Maddie’s ® Shelter Medicine Program at Cornell University primarily operates.

Also in Ithaca is the college’s Janet L. Swanson Wildlife hospital, located in a nearby facility next to the Baker Institute for Animal Health and the Cornell Feline Health Center. Another clinical space near campus is the Cornell Equine Park, which primarily functions as a learning lab for veterinary students and researchers interested in theriogenology and/or sports medicine and rehabilitation.

In 2011, the college opened its first satellite hospital: Cornell University Veterinary Specialists, located in Stamford, Connecticut. This was followed in 2014 by the second satellite hospital: Cornell Ruffian Equine Specialists in Belmont, New York.

In 2015 and 2016, some controversy at the college surrounded clinician care.

According to the college’s most recent annual report, the Cornell University Hospital for Animals saw 30,083 cases in fiscal year 2021. Canine patients were the most common at 20,056 cases, followed by 4,761 feline cases; 1,429 equine cases; 1,319 avian and wildlife cases; 143 bovine cases; 1,659 cases of all other large animals; and 3,072 cases of all other small animals.

Notable alumni
Alexander de Lahunta, founder of veterinary neurology
Clarence C. Combs, Jr., American polo player
Kirksey L. Curd, Cornell's first African-American doctor of veterinary medicine graduate
Martin J. Fettman, veterinarian and astronaut
Mark Gerard, equine veterinarian
Joya Griffin, star of the Nat Geo series "Pop Goes the Vet with Dr. Joya"
Jean Holzworth, veterinarian and specialist in feline medicine
Florence Kimball, the first woman in the United States to receive her doctorate in veterinary medicine
Robert C. T. Lee, Taiwanese veterinarian and politician
Walter Matuszczak, veterinarian and football player
Lila Miller, founder of shelter medicine
Adrian R. Morrison, 1991 AAS Scientific Freedom and Responsibility Award recipient
Patricia O'Connor, veterinarian
Peter Ostrum, actor
Martin Sheldon, veterinarian and scientific researcher
Daniel Elmer Salmon, veterinarian
Ray Van Orman, veterinarian and college football and lacrosse coach

References

External links

Veterinary Medicine
State University of New York statutory colleges
Veterinary schools in the United States
Educational institutions established in 1894
1894 establishments in New York (state)
Veterinary